Domenico Benivieni or Dominicus Benivenius (Florence, 1460 ca. – 1507) was an Italian religious.

Life 

Born in Florence, his father was Paolo Benivieni. Girolamo Benivieni and Antonio Benivieni were his brothers.

He was known for his works on logics, theology and his studies about Aristotle. He was praised by Marsilio Ficino. From 1470 to 1481 taught logics at the University of Pisa.

From 1492 he became one of the main defenders of Girolamo Savonarola and his theories. From February 16, 1498, he was forbidden to attend the sermons of Savonarola and was no longer dispensed with the participation in the choir of his church, from which he was then suspended. He died in 1507.

Works

References 

Italian religious writers